Dana Thomas (born February 3, 1964 in Washington, D.C.) is a fashion and culture journalist and author based in Paris. Her books include  Deluxe: How Luxury Lost Its Luster, Gods and Kings: The Rise and Fall of Alexander McQueen and John Galliano and Fashionopolis: The Price of Fast Fashion and the Future of Clothes. She also wrote the script for Salvatore Ferragamo: The Shoemaker of Dreams, a feature-length documentary directed by award-winning Italian filmmaker Luca Guadagnino. It had its world premiere at the Venice Film Festival on September 5, 2020. She hosts The Green Dream podcast on all things sustainable.

Early life and education
Thomas was born in Washington, D.C. and raised in Radnor, Pennsylvania. She attended Radnor High School and graduated in 1981. Thomas earned a B.A. in Print Journalism at American University in Washington D.C. in 1988.

Career
She began her journalism career working for the Style section of The Washington Post in 1988.

Thomas is the Contributing European Sustainability Editor for British Vogue and a regular contributor to The New York Times Style section. She served as a contributing editor for T: The New York Times Style Magazine from 2012 to 2017 and WSJ., the Wall Street Journals monthly style magazine, from 2011-2012; as the European editor of Conde Nast Portfolio from 2008 to 2009; and as European cultural and fashion correspondent for Newsweek in Paris from 1995 to 2008. She has contributed to various publications including the New York Times Magazine, The New Yorker, Harper's Bazaar, Vogue, Los Angeles Times, Financial Times in London. She also writes regularly for Architectural Digest and Elle Decor.

She has spoken at the Aspen Ideas Festival, Harvard Business School, Yale School of Management, TedxOxford, Business of Fashion Voices, and the Copenhagen Fashion Summit.

She is the author of the New York Times bestseller Deluxe: How Luxury Lost Its Luster, published by The Penguin Press in 2007.  The book addresses the disparity between the rarefied world that luxury once represented- populated by private, family-owned businesses that catered to the aristocracy and the billion-dollar, mass-producing and mass-marketing industry it is today. The New York Times called the Deluxe, "a crisp, witty social history that's as entertaining as it is informative."

In February 2015, Penguin Press published Thomas's second book, Gods and Kings: The Rise and Fall of Alexander McQueen and John Galliano, an investigative double biography of two monumental British fashion designers who succumbed to the pressures of corporate luxury fashion in a globalized world. In 2010, McQueen killed himself; a year later Galliano was fired from the creative helm of Christian Dior for a drunken anti-Semitic outburst in a Paris café.

In September 2019, Penguin Press published Thomas's third book, Fashionopolis: The Price of Fast Fashion and the Future of Clothes, an investigation into the damage wrought by the colossal clothing industry and the grassroots, high-tech, international movement fighting to reform it. The New Yorker called it "a glimpse into how consumerism, slowed to a less ferocious pace, might be reconciled with sustainability.” The New York Review of Books said it was a "Marley's Ghost-style warning of the irrevocable destructions to come . . . Thomas is engaging and vital.”

In 2019, she wrote the screenplay for Salvatore Ferragamo: The Shoemaker of Dreams, an award-winning feature-length documentary directed by Oscar-nominated Italian filmmaker Luca Guadagnino. The film had its world premiere at the Venice Film Festival on September 5, 2020. Prior to, Sony Pictures Classics acquired worldwide distribution rights to the film, excluding Italy.

Thomas is a member of the Anglo-American Press Association in Paris and the Overseas Press Club. She taught journalism at The American University of Paris from 1996 to 1999. In 1987, she received the Society of Professional Journalists Sigma Delta Chi Foundation Scholarship and the Ellis Haller Award for Outstanding Achievement in Journalism.

In 2017, Thomas was a fellow at the Logan Nonfiction Program of the Carey Institute for Global Good.

Bibliography 
 Deluxe: How Luxury Lost Its Luster (2007)
 Gods and Kings: The Rise and Fall of Alexander McQueen and John Galliano (2015)
 Fashionopolis: The Price of Fast Fashion and the Future of Clothes (2019)

Films 
 Salvatore Ferragamo: The Shoemaker of Dreams (2020)

Podcast 

 The Green Dream (2022)

Decorations 
 Chevalier of the Order of Arts and Letters (2016)

References

Further reading
 "Two Books Look Back at Fashion's Messy Choreography". The New York Times. 
 title "Five Lessons about Self-Destruction All Creative People Should Know". Refinery29.
 title "'Gods and Kings,' by Dana Thomas - Review". Kirkus Reviews.
 "Gods and Kings is a Spectacular Work of Reconstruction". The Globe and Mail.
  
  
 'Gods and Kings: The Rise and Fall of Alexander McQueen and John Galliano', by Dana Thomas - Review. The Spectator. 

1964 births
American University School of Communication alumni
American women journalists
Living people
Chevaliers of the Ordre des Arts et des Lettres
21st-century American women